Close to My Heart is a 1951 American drama film directed by William Keighley, written by James R. Webb (based on his novel A Baby for Midge), and starring Ray Milland and Gene Tierney.

Plot
Brad Sheridan (Milland), a newspaper columnist, and wife, Midge Sheridan (Tierney), cannot have children of their own; and, they decide to adopt.  The adoption agency tells Midge the waiting list is long; however, Midge learns of an abandoned child left at the police station. The police tell Midge the child, a boy named Danny, is a ward of the juvenile court. Brad and Midge visit the child under the ruse of Midge being Brad's secretary. Brad thinks their chances to adopt Danny are slim if the child is placed with the adoption agency because of the long wait. Midge continues to visit Danny and becomes attached. Brad, not wanting to become too emotionally involved, writes a column disclosing the child's abandonment, angering Midge. Mrs. Morrow, from the adoption agency, inspects the Sheridan's home, but warns them that adopting Danny is risky due to the child's un-investigated background. Danny is not wanted by other prospective adoptive parents because he is a "foundling," which clears a path for the Sheridans to adopt him. Brad is told of a well-known local couple's adopted son becoming an adult criminal, with his adoptive parents only then discovering he came from an irreputable background.

Brad's investigation leads him to an apartment and a woman named Arlene who tells Brad that Danny's mother, named Martha, died giving birth at the apartment building.   Arlene lied to authorities that the child's father took the baby, and she took the child herself. She gives Brad a ring belonging to Martha.  Without Midge's knowledge, Brad begins an investigation of Martha's history. The operator of a boarding house where Martha stayed, gives Brad a sweater that belonged to Martha. Brad tells Midge of his efforts to investigate Danny's background.  Mrs. Morrow from the adoption agency warns Midge that Brad should stop his investigation; and, the agency cannot go forward with the adoption unless he does. Meanwhile, Brad discovers Martha was a reputable schoolteacher who was keeping company with a man, named Edward Hewitt, who Brad suspects accompanied Martha to Reno to marry her.  Brad directs a photo of Hewitt be published for identification. Mrs. Morrow recognizes Hewitt's photo, informs Midge that Hewitt is incarcerated for murder, and tells her the adoption cannot go forward.

Brad visits Hewitt at San Quentin State Prison.  Brad tells Hewitt, whose real name is Everett Heilner, that he has a son and Martha died giving birth. A callous Hewitt says there was no place in his life for a child and tells Brad the boy will "never be a cop." Brad returns home and learns from an embittered Midge the agency took Danny in order to protect Danny from Brad. Brad rushes out to retrieve the child but is stopped by the court's probation officer. Brad convinces Mrs. Morrow to approve the adoption after disclosing Danny's real father, now dead, was actually Heilner's brother according to the prison warden; and, that nuturing a child is more important than the nature of the child's background.

Cast
 Ray Milland as Brad Sheridan
 Gene Tierney as Midge Sheridan
 Fay Bainter as Mrs. Morrow
 Howard St. John as E.O. Frost
 Mary Beth Hughes as Arlene
 Ann Morrison as Mrs. Barker
 James Seay as Everett C. Heilner / Edward C. Hewitt
 Baby John Winslow as 	Baby Danny (as Baby John)
 Eddie Marr as Taxi Driver Dunne

Production
Ray Milland and Gene Tierney were loaned out to star in this Warner Bros.' film.

Gene Tierney was still trying to cope with the personal tragedy of giving birth to a severely disabled daughter.

Radio adaptation
Close to My Heart was presented on Lux Radio Theatre March 2, 1953. The one-hour adaptation starred Milland and Phyllis Thaxter.

Notes

External links
 
 
 
 

 

1951 films
1951 drama films
American black-and-white films
American drama films
Films directed by William Keighley
Films scored by Max Steiner
Warner Bros. films
1950s English-language films
1950s American films
English-language drama films